Palloptera claripennis is a species of flutter fly in the family Pallopteridae.

References

Pallopteridae
Articles created by Qbugbot
Insects described in 1924
Taxa named by John Russell Malloch